Major General Philip Michael Jeffery,  (12 December 1937 – 18 December 2020) was a senior Australian Army officer and vice-regal representative. He was the 28th governor of Western Australia from 1993 to 2000, and the 24th governor-general of Australia, serving from 2003 to 2008.

From Perth, Western Australia, Jeffery graduated from the Royal Military College, Duntroon, and served in the Malayan Emergency and the Vietnam War, being awarded the Military Cross during the latter conflict.

Jeffery was at various stages commander of the Special Air Service Regiment and the 1st Division, and subsequently Deputy Chief of General Staff, before retiring from active service in 1993. After serving for seven years as Governor of Western Australia, Jeffery was appointed Governor-General of Australia in 2003, following the resignation of Peter Hollingworth. He was the first career Australian Army officer to hold the position, and was succeeded by Quentin Bryce.

Early life and military career
Jeffery was born in Wiluna, Western Australia, on 12 December 1937, and was educated at Kent Street Senior High School. At 16 he left Perth to attend the Royal Military College, Duntroon, in Canberra.

After graduating in 1958, he served in a number of junior positions before being posted to Malaya in 1962 for operational service. From 1966 to 1969 he served in Papua New Guinea. During this posting, he married Marlena Kerr of Sydney, with whom he had three sons and a daughter. This was followed by a tour of duty in the Vietnam War, during which he was awarded the Military Cross (MC).

In 1972, Jeffery was promoted to lieutenant colonel, commanding the 2nd Battalion of the Pacific Islands Regiment from 1974 to 1975. He assumed command of the Special Air Service Regiment (SASR) in Perth from 7 January 1976 until 22 October 1977, and was then promoted to colonel as the first Director of the Army's Special Action Forces in 1979.

From 1982 to 1983, Jeffery headed Australia's national counter-terrorist co-ordination authority. In 1985 he was promoted to major general, being appointed to command the 1st Division the following year. In 1990 he became Deputy Chief of the General Staff and in 1991 he was appointed Assistant Chief of the General Staff for Materiel.

Jeffery retired from the army in 1993, and was appointed to the ceremonial position of Honorary Colonel of the SASR.

Career

Governor of Western Australia (1993–2000) 
In November 1993, Jeffery was appointed Governor of Western Australia and in June 1996 he was appointed a Companion of the Order of Australia (AC). He was appointed a Commander of the Royal Victorian Order (CVO) on 1 April 2000.

During his seven years in the post he made a number of public statements of his conservative views on marriage, sex and education. He received some criticism from the Labor opposition and sections of the media for appearing to take positions on political issues.

Governor-General of Australia (2003–2008) 
Following the resignation of Peter Hollingworth as Governor-General of Australia, Prime Minister John Howard announced on 22 June 2003 that he had chosen Jeffery to succeed Hollingworth. He was formally appointed by Elizabeth II, Queen of Australia and sworn in on 11 August 2003, becoming the first Australian career soldier to become governor-general.

Jeffrey has represented Australia at multiple royal weddings, including the Wedding of Frederik, Crown Prince of Denmark, and Mary Donaldson and the Wedding of Prince Charles and Camilla Parker Bowles.

In 2005, Jeffery became a co-patron of the private, non-profit Australia China Friendship and Exchange Association (ACFEA), founded by Chinese-Australian businessman Chau Chak Wing. The organization promoted bilateral and international dialogue, particularly between China and Australia, having established the annual Imperial Springs International Forum in 2014.

On 8 April 2005, Jeffery represented Australia at the funeral of Pope John Paul II.

In 2007, in his position as governor-general, Jeffery was appointed as the colonel-in-chief of the Royal Australian Army Medical Corps, succeeding the previous colonel-in-chief, Queen Elizabeth The Queen Mother.

Jeffery was the Chief Scout of Australia.

Jeffery left Yarralumla prior to the swearing-in of his successor, Quentin Bryce, the former Governor of Queensland. Bryce was sworn in on 5 September 2008.

Career after office
On 23 October 2012, at the National Farmers' Federation Congress in Canberra, Prime Minister Julia Gillard announced the appointment of Jeffery as Australia's first Advocate for Soil Health. Gillard noted that, as Governor-General, Jeffery had a passion for regional development and the future of our rural industries, a commitment he continued after leaving office. 
Prime Minister Tony Abbott extended Jeffery's appointment as the national Advocate for Soil Health until December 2014, indicating Jeffery would continue to raise public awareness of the role soil plays in underpinning sustainable productivity, delivering quality ecosystem services and helping to meet global challenges including food security and climate change.

In June 2020, Jeffery stepped down from this role, now the Patron of the Soil Cooperative Research Centre, due to illness.

Honours and awards

Unit Award:

Personal life
Jeffery was a Christian. He died on 18 December 2020, at the age of 83.

References

|-

|-

|-

1937 births
2020 deaths
Australian Christians
Australian generals
Australian military personnel of the Malayan Emergency
Australian military personnel of the Vietnam War
Companions of the Order of Australia
Australian Commanders of the Royal Victorian Order
Royal Military College, Duntroon graduates
Governors of Western Australia
Governors-General of Australia
Honorary Grand Companions of the Order of Logohu
Australian recipients of the Military Cross
Recipients of the Centenary Medal
People from Wiluna, Western Australia
People educated at Kent Street Senior High School
Place of death missing